Sigma Sigma is a men's upperclassmen honorary fraternity at the University of Cincinnati. Founded in 1898, it is the oldest of such organizations at the University of Cincinnati. The constitution of the organization is as follows, "The name of the organization shall be Sigma Sigma. All matters transacted shall be for the good of the order and of the University of Cincinnati. This constitution shall not be amended."

History
Sigma Sigma was founded in the summer of 1898 by Parke Johnson, Russell Wilson, Robert Humphreys, Walter Everhardt, Charles W. Adler, Smith Hickenlooper, Andrew Hickenlooper, and Ada Innes. Originally created as a sophomore society, by 1902 Sigma Sigma had become known as an upperclassmen male organization. The purpose has remained the same, advancement of the University of Cincinnati, which has been carried out in many ways since the founding.

The organization donated the ceremonial mace that is carried in by the university marshal before each commencement ceremony.

Since its founding the organization has sponsored a number of events and philanthropic goals for the university, with the organization's membership donating over $72 million as of 2019.

Sigma Sigma Commons

Leading up to the organization's centennial in 1998, the society contributed to the university through the Sigma Sigma Commons as part of the 1991 master plan of the campus. The society raised over $1.8 million to complete the project, which encapsulates 3.5 acres and includes a granite amphitheater seats for 1,850 people and the 64 ft tall Ronald Walker Tower.

Carnival
An annual tradition since 1939, each year Sigma Sigma holds a carnival for the student body with booths run by a number of student organizations. The carnival traditionally brings thousands of people to campus and Sigma Sigma uses the proceeds for various donations back to the university. Since the completion of the Sigma Sigma Commons, the Carnival is annually held in the space. Previously, the carnival was hosted at the Armory Fieldhouse and Nippert Stadium.

Mr. Bearcat
Another tradition of the organization, is the long-standing award of Mr. Bearcat. The honor recognizes a graduating senior man who has achieved academic success, demonstrated leadership in diverse settings, and contributed to the University of Cincinnati with Bearcat spirit. The award has been given annually by Sigma Sigma since 1949.

Notable student members
Russell Wilson (1898), politician and former Mayor of Cincinnati
Smith Hickenlooper (1898), US federal judge
Jimmy Nippert (1923), college football player and namesake for Nippert Stadium
George Smith (1933), head basketball coach and athletic director at Cincinnati
Jim Holstein (1951), NBA player, head basketball coach at Ball State
Ralph Staub (1951), former college football player, head football coach at Cincinnati
Tony Trabert (1951), former amateur World No. 1 tennis champion
Jack Twyman (1953), NBA player
David Canary (1958), actor
Carl Bouldin (1960), MLB player
Tony Yates (1963), college basketball player, head basketball coach at Cincinnati
Brig Owens (1964), NFL player
Myron Ullman (1967), former chairman and CEO of J. C. Penney, current chairman of Starbucks Corporation
Greg Cook (1969), NFL player
Jim O'Brien (1969), NFL player
Tyrone Yates (1975), former OH State Representative, judge
Kari Yli-Renko (1980), CFL player
George Warhop (1983), American football offensive line coach
Reggie Taylor (1987), CFL player
Lewis Johnson (1987), sports commentator and sports reporter
Roger McClendon (1987), college basketball player, former chief sustainability officer of Yum! Brands
Doug Rosfeld (1999), college football player, NFL coach
Zach Collaros (2009), CFL player
Jason Kelce (2009), NFL player
Josh Schneider (2009), competition swimmer
Chazz Anderson (2010), college football player
J. K. Schaffer (2010), NFL player
Connor Barwin (2011), NFL player
Sean Kilpatrick (2012), NBA player
Gary Clark (2018), NBA player
Alec Pierce (2021), NFL player

Source

Notable alumni members
Walter Langsam (1971), former president of the University of Cincinnati
William Keating Sr. (1975), former US Representative, newspaper executive

Source

See also

References

Collegiate secret societies
Honor societies
Student societies in the United States
University of Cincinnati
Student organizations established in 1898
1898 establishments in Ohio